Aulonocara jacobfreibergi, the eureka red peacock, is a species of fish in the family Cichlidae. It is also known as Freiberg's peacock or fairy cichlid. There are several colour morphs including red or yellow. They generally can grow to around 15 cm in length.

It is endemic to Malawi where it has been observed at Nkudzi, Monkey Bay, Nankumba, Domwe Islands and Otter Point in Lake Malawi.

The specific name honours the fish importer Jacob Freiberg of Verona, New Jersey who was the co-collector of the type.

See also
List of freshwater aquarium fish species

References

External links

Fishbase

Fish of Malawi
jacobfreibergi
Fish described in 1974
Fish of Lake Malawi